The men's RS:X competition of the sailing events at the 2015 Pan American Games in Toronto was held from July 12 to July 18 at the Royal Canadian Yacht Club.

Points were assigned based on the finishing position in each race (1 for first, 2 for second, etc.). The points were totaled from the top 12 results of the first 13 races, with lower totals being better. If a sailor was disqualified or did not complete the race, 8 points were assigned for that race (as there were 7 sailors in this competition). The top 5 sailors at that point competed in the final race, with placings counting double for final score. The sailor with the lowest total score won.

Schedule
All times are Eastern Daylight Time (UTC-4).

Results
Race M is the medal race.

References

External links
Sailing schedule

Sailing at the 2015 Pan American Games
RS:X competitions